This is a list of notable University of Peradeniya people. This includes distinguished alumni of various fields and distinguished faculty people.

Law, politics and international relations
Dr. Sarath Amunugama MP, CCS – Cabinet Minister of Public Administration and Home Affairs; former Deputy Minister of Finance and Planning
Prof. Ranjith Bandara, Member of Parliament in Sri Lanka
His excellency Sirisena Amarasekara – Sri Lankan High commissioner to South Africa, Mozambique, Namibia, Zambia, Zimbabwe, Lesotho, Angola, Botswana, and Eswatini.
Dr. Jayantha Dhanapala, SLOS – former Under-Secretary-General for Disarmament Affairs, United Nations
Amarasiri Dodangoda – former Cabinet Minister of Public Administration and Home Affairs of Sri Lanka
Hon. Justice Mark Fernando – former judge of the Supreme Court of Sri Lanka
 Nandana Gunathilake – former Cabinet minister of posts and telecommunications
Dr. Dayan Jayatilleka SLOS – Permanent Mission of Sri Lanka to the United Nations at Geneva; Consul General for Switzerland
 Sri Lankabhimanya Hon. Lakshman Kadirgamar – diplomat, politician and lawyer
Dr. Vikramabahu Karunaratne – Leader, New Left Front (NLF) and a controversial Politician in Sri Lanka
Hon. W. J. S. Karunaratne, SLAS – Sri Lankan High Commissioner to Canada; former secretary to the president
Hon. W. J. M. Lokubandara – Speaker of the Parliament (2005–2010)
 Athuraliye Rathana Thero – Jathika Hela Urumaya MP
Prof. Neelan Tiruchelvam – Sri Lankan Tamil politician; peace activist; academic; founder and director of the International Centre for Ethnic Studies; founder and director of The Law and Society Trust; assassinated by an LTTE suicide bomber in 1999
 Ranjit Uyangoda – former Sri Lankan Ambassador to Japan; current Sri Lankan Ambassador to China
Prof. Wiswa Warnapala – former Minister of Higher Education, Sri Lanka
Harischandra Wijayatunga – leader of the Sinhalaye Mahasammatha Bhoomiputra Pakshaya; compiler of the Gunasena Great Sinhala Dictionary

Academics

Professors and scholars
Prof. K. M. de Silva – Executive Director of the International Centre for Ethnic Studies
Prof. K. N. O. Dharmadasa – editor-in-chief, Sinhala encyclopaedia
Prof. Gishan Dissanaike – financial economist; Adam Smith Professor of Corporate Governance at the University of Cambridge; head of the Finance Department; Director of the Cambridge MPhil Programme in Finance
Prof. Sucharitha Gamlath – winner of Rowland's gold medal, Jayanayake Prize and the oriental research scholarship; Trotskyist; professor in Sinhala; Dean of Jaffna University; served in the Rajarata University and Ruhunu University; scholar in linguistics; pioneering Sri Lankan Marxist critic; author of many books
Prof. Shelton Gunaratne – Professor emeritus (Mass Communications), Minnesota State University; writer; scholar
Prof. Leslie Gunatilake – Fellow of the Third World Academy of Sciences and National Academy of Sciences, Sri Lanka, Director, SW Centre for natural products research and commercialisation and Professor of the University of Arizona
Prof. Ashley Halpe – Professor emeritus of English; poet, playwright and scholar
Prof. Tissa Jayatilaka – political analyst; director of the Centre for Policy Alternatives-Sri Lanka; director of the Fulbright Commission of Sri Lanka; chairman of the Jury for Presidential Awards for Sri Lankan Sinhala Films; visiting professor of Grinnell College, US
Prof.Saman Warnakulasuriya – OBE- Emeritus Professor King's College London, UK & Director WHO Collaborating Centre on Oral Cancer
Prof. Amal Jayawardane – Sri Lankan historian; visiting professor at the American University; research scholar at the Department of International Relations, London School of Economics
Prof. David Kalupahana – Buddhist scholar; Emeritus Professor of Philosophy at the University of Hawaii
Prof. Gananath Obeyesekere – Emeritus Professor of anthropology at Princeton University; leading anthropologist; entered into an intellectual debate with Marshall Sahlins over the rationality of indigenous people through the details of Captain James Cook's death in the Hawaiian Islands in 1779
Prof. P.D. Premasiri – Buddhist scholar; Professor Emeritus of Pali and Buddhist Studies at the University of Peradeniya. 
 Dr. Michael Roberts – historian 
 Professor Lakshman Samaranayake – Dean of the Faculty of Dentistry (2004 -), University of Hong Kong; Tam Wah-Ching Professor in Oral Sciences; King James IV Professor, Royal College of Surgeons of Edinburgh; first Asian to receive the latter honour; first dental surgeon in Sri Lanka to receive DSc (honoris Causa) from the University of Peradeniya
Dr. S. W. R de A Samarasinghe – Director, Tulane Institute for International Development, US; founder-editor of The Kandy News
Kala Keerthi, Dharma Shastra Visharadha Kirthi Sri, Prof. Anuradha Seneviratna – scholar
Prof. Sudharshan Seneviratne – professor of archaeology; Fulbright Visiting Professor at Cornell University and Carleton College; archaeological director of the UNESCO programs at Anuradhapura
Prof. Pandula Andagama – Anthropologist; Head of the Anthropology Division, and assistant director of the National Museum of Colombo.

University Presidents, Chancellors and Vice Chancellors
Prof. S. B. S. Abayakoon – Vice-Chancellor of University of Peradeniya; former Dean of the Faculty of Engineering, University of Peradeniya
Prof. Sarath Amunugama – Vice Chancellor of the University of Kelaniya, Sri Lanka
Prof. C. L. V. Jayathilake – Chancellor of the Wayamba University of Sri Lanka; former Vice Chancellor of the University of Peradeniya
Prof. S. "Sam" Karunaratne – former Vice Chancellor of University of Moratuwa; current Chancellor of the Sri Lanka Institute of Information Technology
Prof. Leslie Panditharatne – Vice Chancellor, University of Peradeniya (1978–84); Chairman of the University Grants Commission of Sri Lanka (1993–94); chairman and director general of the National Institute of Business Management (N.I.B.M – 1988); chairman and Director General of the Mineral Sands Corporation (Lanka Mineral Sands in 1989 – 1994); Director of Studies at the American College of Higher Education
Dr. Indira Samarasekara – President of the University of Alberta, Canada
Prof. Chandima Wijebandara – scholar of Buddhism; Vice Chancellor of University of Sri Jayewardenepura

Deans
Prof. Nalin de Silva – former Dean of the Faculty of Science University of Kelaniya; commission member of UGC
Prof. M. P. Ranaweera – former Dean of the Faculty of Engineering, University of Peradeniya

Medicine
Prof. Aloka Abey Bandara – developer of an antibiotic vaccine to control infectious Brucellosis
Prof. Malik Peiris, FRS Légion d'Honneur – Tam Wah-Ching Professor in Medical Science; Chair Professor, Department of Microbiology at the University of Hong Kong; Scientific Director, HKU-Pasteur Research Centre; first Sri Lankan to be elected a Fellow of the Royal Society; discoverer of severe acute respiratory syndrome (SARS) virus; proposed the Cytokine storm theory of avian influenza

Science and technology
Veerasingham Dhuruvasangary – soil researcher; development engineer

Military and police
Cyril Herath – former Sri Lankan Inspector-General of Police; Permanent Secretary to the Ministry of Defence
Major General Janaka Perera – RWP, RSP, VSV, USP, RCDS, Psc, CR – Chief of Staff of the Sri Lanka Army; one of the most distinguished generals in Sri Lankan history
Rear Admiral Sunil Ranjan Samaratunga – RSP, VSV, USP of the Sri Lanka Navy
Ana Seneviratne – former Sri Lankan Inspector-General of Police; Sri Lankan High Commissioner to Malaysia

Literature
Sengai Aaliyan – Sri Lankan Tamil writer
Dr. Gunadasa Amarasekera – Sinhala writer, poet, and essayist
T. Arasanayagam – author
Nihal De Silva – author; winner of International Dublin Literary Award and the Gratiaen Prize
Dr. SinhaRaja Tammita Delgoda – author and traveller
Prof. J. B. Disanayake – head of the Department of Sinhala, University of Colombo
Siri Gunasinghe – sanskritist, art historian, premier Sinhalese poet, novelist, literary critic and filmmaker
Prof. Kusuma Karunaratne – first female professor of Sinhala language; first woman to secure a First Class Honours degree in Sinhala

Film, theatre and television
Gunasena Galappatty – pioneer of suspense drama in Sri Lanka
Prof. A.J. Gunawardena – film critic
Trilicia Gunawardena – actress; played the roles of "Anula" in Lester James Peries' Gamperaliya and "Maname Bisawa" in Professor Ediriweera Sarachchandra's Maname
Gamini Hattotuwegama – the father of modern street theatre in Sri Lanka
Dhamma Jagoda – first Head of the Drama Unit at the National Television channel Rupavahini; pioneer theater and television play director and actor in Sri Lanka
Prof. Dharmasena Pathiraja – Sri Lankan film director and screenwriter
Somalatha Subasinghe – children's playwright; founder of the Children's and Youth Theatre Organisation
Namel Weeramuni – playwright

Arts
Stanley Kirinde SLAS – one of Sri Lanka's most outstanding artistic talents of the 20th century; former state secretary of the Ministry of Ports and Shipping; painter of the President's House (Kandy and Colombo), the Foreign Ministry, the Military Academy
Tilak Samarawickrema – artist, architect and designer

Music
Dr. Tanya Ekanayaka – composer-pianist and first Sri Lankan composer to have entire albums of original music released globally by international record labels
Bridget Halpe – choral director

Religion
Bogoda Seelawimala Nayaka Thera – incumbent Head Priest of the London Buddhist Vihara; current Chief Sangha Nayaka of Great Britain
Katukurunde Nanananda Thera – Buddhist monk, scholar
Nyanaponika Thera – German-born Sri-Lanka-ordained Theravada monk; co-founder of the Buddhist Publication Society; author of seminal Theravada books; teacher of contemporary Western Buddhist leaders such as Bhikkhu Bodhi

Journalists
Taraki Sivaram – political analyst and a senior editor for Tamilnet.com

Civil servants
H. H. Bandara SLAS – former assistant director of Cultural Affairs and assistant secretary in the Ministry of Education
Susantha De Alwis, SLOS – former Sri Lankan Ambassador to the United States, Japan, South Korea; Permanent Representative to United Nations (Geneva
A. S. Jayawardene, – former Governor of the Central Bank of Sri Lanka; Permanent Secretary of the Ministry of Finance & Treasury; Alternate Executive Director of the International Monetary Fund (IMF)
Nihal Seneviratne – former Secretary General of Parliament (1981–1994); parliamentary affairs adviser to the Prime Minister
Lalith Weeratunga, CAS – current Permanent Secretary to the President of Sri Lanka
Wilhelm Woutersz, SLOS – former Permanent Secretary to the Ministry of Foreign Affairs of Sri Lanka; Sri Lankan Ambassador to People's Republic of China, Italy and Yugoslavia

Business and finance
D. K. Rajapaksa – managing director, DSI Samson Group (Pvt) Ltd.

Faculty
Prof. Arjuna Aluwihare – Vice Chancellor of the University of Peradeniya (1988–89); Professor of Surgery 1985–2002 at the University of Peradeniya; Chairman of the University Grants Commission of Sri Lanka; WFME Executive Committee and Acting President SEARAME, SEAR and Global Advisory Committee of Health Research of WHO; Commissioner of Human Rights Sri Lanka
Prof. Adele Barker – professor of Russian literature, Arizona State University
Prof. Seneka Bibile – founder of Sri Lanka's drug policy; medical benefactor to humanity
Prof. Warren Ranjithan Breckenridge – professor of zoology; former president of Sri Lanka Institute of Biology
Prof. K. M. de Silva – historian, chairman of the International Centre for Ethnic Studies
Prof. M. W. Sugathapala de Silva – linguist at the Department of Sinhalese, University of Peradeniya until 1964.
Prof. George Dissanaike – former Senior Professor and Head of the Department of Physics, University of Peradeniya; Fellow of the National Academy of Sciences; past President of the Institute of Physics, Sri Lanka
Prof. D. E. Hettiaratchchi – first editor-in-chief, Sinhala encyclopaedia
Prof. E. F. C. Ludowyk – professor of English; author
Prof. Gunapala Malalasekera – Sri Lankan scholar and diplomat; compiler of the Gunapala Sinhala-English dictionary
Dr. Robin Mayhead – founder of the choral group Peradeniya Singers
Prof. Gananath Obeyesekere – professor in sociology; Emeritus Professor of Anthropology at Princeton University; leading anthropologist; entered into an intellectual debate with Marshall Sahlins over the rationality of indigenous people through the details of Captain James Cook's death in the Hawaiian Islands in 1779
Prof. Senarath Paranavithana – pioneering archaeologist and epigraphist of Sri Lanka; once the archaeological commissioner
Prof. Anuradha Seneviratna – Sri Lankan scholar
Prof. Stanley Jeyaraja Tambiah – professor of anthropology (1955–1960); leading social anthropologist and Esther and Sidney Rabb Professor Emeritus of Anthropology at Harvard University; recipient of the Balzan Prize, the highest recognition of the Royal Anthropological Institute of Great Britain and Ireland, the Huxley Memorial Medal and Lecture, and the Fukuoka Asian Culture Prize by the city of Fukuoka, capital of Fukuoka Prefecture, Japan; Corresponding Fellow of the British Academy
Prof. A. J. Wilson – author; chair of political science at University of Peradeniya; Head of the Department of Political Science, University of New Brunswick at Fredericton

Librarians
H. A. I. Goonetilleke – director of the University of Peradeniya library; first chairman of the Gratiaen Trust; scholar

Sportsmen and sports administrators 
D. H. de Silva – first class cricketer, sports administrator and coach

References

External links
Official website of the University of Peradeniya
Alumni Association of the University of Peradeniya

Peradeniya